Daniel Ovidiu Nicula (born 20 March 2003) is a Romanian professional footballer who plays as a midfielder for Liga III side Viitorul Dăești. Nicula started his football career at CSȘ Blaj and had a very tough childhood, growing up in a foster house from Alba County.

References

External links
 
 

2003 births
Living people
People from Alba County
Romanian footballers
Association football midfielders
Liga I players
CS Gaz Metan Mediaș players
Liga III players